Vasily Shaptsiaboi is a Belarusian Paralympic biathlete, cross-country skier, and road bicycle racer who won many medals at both Winter and Summer Paralympic Games.

Career
He began his Paralympic career in Sydney, Australia in 2000 where he won bronze medal in Men's T13 Track Athletics Relay. In 2004 he participated at the Athens Paralympic Games at which he won gold medals in both Men's Tandem Road Race and Time Trial for Visually Impaired. His first Winter Paralympics appearance was at the Vancouver Paralympic Games where he won two bronze medals in 3 km Biathlon and Cross-Country 20 km Freestyle. In 2011 he participated at the IPC Nordic Skiing World Cup which was hosted in Sjusjoe, Norway. He also took participation in various cycling events at the London Paralympic Games. On March 8, 2014, he won a bronze medal in biathlon which was hosted in Sochi, Russia.

References

Living people
1979 births
Paralympic bronze medalists for Belarus
Paralympic gold medalists for Belarus
Belarusian male sprinters
Paralympic athletes of Belarus
Cyclists at the 2004 Summer Paralympics
Cyclists at the 2012 Summer Paralympics
Cross-country skiers at the 2010 Winter Paralympics
Biathletes at the 2014 Winter Paralympics
Belarusian male biathletes
Belarusian male cross-country skiers
Biathletes at the 2018 Winter Paralympics
Medalists at the 2000 Summer Paralympics
Medalists at the 2004 Summer Paralympics
Paralympic medalists in biathlon
Paralympic medalists in cycling
People from Mogilev
Sportspeople from Mogilev Region